Donatyre is a village in the district of Avenches of the Canton of Vaud, Switzerland. Since losing its status as an independent municipality on 1 July 2006, it has been part of the municipality of Avenches.

The village, which follows the old Roman wall of Aventicum, contains a chapel dedicated to Saint Thecla.

References

Villages in the canton of Vaud
Former municipalities of the canton of Vaud